Mega Man X5, known as  in Japan, is a video game developed by Capcom. It is the fifth main installment in the Mega Man X series. It was first released for the PlayStation in Japan on November 30, 2000 and in North America and PAL territories the following year.

Mega Man X5 is set in the 22nd century in a world where humans coexist with humanoid androids called "Reploids". Daily life is under a constant threat of these Reploids going "Maverick" and participating in dangerous and deadly crimes. After the events of Mega Man X4, the Maverick leader Sigma has been revived and seeks to unlock the true power of the former Maverick Zero and destroy the hero X in the process. To make matters worse, Sigma has set the space colony Eurasia on a 16-hour collision course with Earth. It is up to X and Zero to stop Sigma once again and save the planet from destruction. Like its predecessors, Mega Man X5 is an action-platform game in which the player controls either protagonist through a series of eight, selectable stages and wins the special weapon of each stage's boss. However, the game only offers limited number of stage attempts before the player must deal with the colony.

According to Capcom producer Keiji Inafune, Mega Man X5 was originally intended to be the final game in the Mega Man X saga. Critical reception for the game was generally positive, with many reviewers agreeing that the stale gameplay formula will only further satisfy diehard fans of the series. Mega Man X5 was ported to the Microsoft Windows as retail packages in 2002 in both Japan and North America. It was also re-released in 2006 as part of the Mega Man X Collection for the GameCube and PlayStation 2. Mega Man X5 was made available on the PlayStation Network as part of the PSOne Classics line for North America and Japan in 2014. It became available for Windows via Steam, PlayStation 4, Xbox One and Nintendo Switch as a part of Mega Man X Legacy Collection 2 on July 24, 2018 worldwide and July 26, 2018 in Japan.

Plot

Like other entries in the series, Mega Man X5 takes place in "21XX", an unspecified year in the 22nd century, where humans have adapted to life with intelligent android dubbed "Reploids". Months have passed since the events of Mega Man X4. The series' primary antagonist, a "Maverick" Reploid named Sigma has been revived once again. Sigma begins conducting research on the origin and design of the "Maverick Hunter" Zero and decides to discover how to unlock Zero's true power, hoping to destroy Sigma's nemesis X in addition. Sigma attacks the Maverick Hunters directly, intending to lose. When he does, he spreads a Maverick virus across the Earth, throwing it into chaos. Meanwhile, a Reploid mercenary named Dynamo is hired by Sigma to make the space colony Eurasia collide with Earth. The Hunters have only 16 hours to stop the collision. In order to prevent Eurasia from striking the planet, the Hunters pursue two options. The first option is to fire a powerful cannon called "Enigma" at Eurasia, vaporizing it. If the Enigma shot fails, the second option is to launch a space shuttle and pilot it into the colony, destroying it. To maximize their chances, X and Zero are dispatched to collect parts for the two devices with the aid of their new teammates Alia, Douglas, and Signas. The necessary parts to upgrade the Enigma and shuttle are held by eight Mavericks, and X and Zero must defeat them to claim the parts.

Whether the Enigma and shuttle succeed or fail is randomly determined by the game, although the Enigma's chances of working successfully are low even with all its parts, while the shuttle has a much higher probability of succeeding assuming all of the parts are collected. Whether the Enigma succeeds or fails, a new virus appears on the Earth, noted by Alia as the Sigma virus combining with the scraps from the colony. If the Enigma or the shuttle succeeds, X and Zero proceed to hunt for the cause of the virus. If the shuttle fails or if the time expires, the colony crashes, nearly destroying the planet; Zero then is infected by the virus. In either case, once the location of the virus' origin is discovered, the Hunters investigate. X and Zero penetrate a bizarre underground fortress. In the fortress, X and Zero cross paths, where mutual suspicion and mistrust leads to a duel between the heroes.

After the duel, the story diverges slightly. If Zero goes Maverick as a result of the virus, he sacrifices himself to save X from Sigma, and X continues on alone to defeat Sigma. If Zero does not go Maverick, he saves X and himself from Sigma, and both have a chance to confront Sigma. Mega Man X5 has three possible endings. If Zero goes Maverick, X defeats Sigma, but is badly damaged. A mysterious figure recovers him, but also deletes all his memories of Zero. If Zero does not go Maverick, Sigma decides to make the Hunters' victory for naught by taking them down with him. X tries to save Zero but is ambushed by Sigma and both Hunters are critically damaged. Zero manages to finish Sigma off, then the endings diverge again depending on the player character. If Zero defeats Sigma, he reflects on his origin and life before dying. If X defeats Sigma, he inherits Zero's beam saber weapon and continues to fight as a Maverick Hunter.

Gameplay
The main gameplay remains similar to previous installments. Unlike X4, the player can freely switch between both the shooter X and the swordsman Zero while playing through the game. Depending on which character the player uses to start it, the other one will be affected negatively with X losing his X4 armor and Zero losing his buster. There are four armors for X—his Ultimate Armor, the upgraded armor from Mega Man X4, and two others that must be assembled from capsules. However, X cannot wear parts of these armors separately. X can also no longer shoot his buster through walls, and each character has the ability to duck. Zero is able to find and enter Dr. Light's capsules, however, he cannot use the armor parts given, instead retaining the part to bring to X. However, if Zero reaches the capsule that contains X's Ultimate Armor, Dr. Light will offer the "Black Zero" Armor instead of the Ultimate Armor that enhances his abilities. Besides regular enemies and bosses, X and Zero can be chased by a phantom virus that will try to infect the characters. If X is sufficiently infected by enough viruses, he will enter a state where his health rapidly declines. However, if Zero is sufficiently infected, he becomes briefly invincible, with increased attack power. At any point between levels, the player has the option of firing the Enigma at the Eurasia. If the Enigma misses, then the player has the option of launching the shuttle. Whether the crash is prevented or not is determined by random chance. If the crash is not prevented, the course of the story is changed. Due to the nature of the storyline, there are multiple endings. Whether X or Zero is used to defeat the last boss also affects which ending is seen.

Development
Mega Man X5 was originally meant to be the last game of the Mega Man X series. As stated by producer Keiji Inafune, "I had very little to do with X5. I just told the team to 'finish off the series with this title,' and left it at that. That's why the game itself has a real feel of finality to it." However, Capcom decided to publish Mega Man X6 the following year, in which Zero survived his fight from X5, much to the dismay of Inafune. Haruki Suetsugu, an artist for Mega Man X4, designed nearly all of the characters and promotional artwork for Mega Man X5. Suetsugu added various details to set the characters apart from one another. X's new Falcon Armor was designed by Ryuji Higurashi, who wanted it to resemble a bird with beak-shaped chest piece, wings coming out of the back, and a talon-like arm cannon. Suetsugu designed the Gaea Armor, which was meant to resemble Sanagiman from the Inazuman manga series. The Maverick bosses in the English localization of Mega Man X5 are named after members of the American hard rock band Guns N' Roses. Capcom voice actress Alyson Court, who was involved in the game's localization, came up with the new names as a tribute to her then-husband's love of the band. For the Mega Man X Legacy Collection 2 release, the Maverick Bosses names were changed to translations of their original Japanese names.

The musical score for Mega Man X5 was composed by Naoto Tanaka, Naoya Kamisaka, and Takuya Miyawaki. The Japanese version of Mega Man X5 features one opening theme, "Monkey", and one closing theme, both composed and performed by Showtaro Morikubo and his band Mosquito Milk. All of the game's instrumental and vocal music was compiled on the Capcom Music Generation: Rockman X1 ~ X6 soundtrack released by Suleputer in 2003. The theme songs were also included on the Rockman Theme Song Collection, published by Suleputer in 2002.

Reception

Mega Man X5 was generally well-received, with IGN giving the game an 8.5 out of 10. However, they added that though the game was fun to play, it was "more of the same" from Capcom, and that Mega Man, like many other series made by Capcom, was being milked for as much as it was worth. GameSpot similarly commented that "Fans of the classic 2D games will no doubt find much to love in X5, while those who can't get into the aging conventions and mechanics probably won't care a great deal for it." The Official UK PlayStation Magazine said that the game was "unforgivably primitive".

According to the Japanese publication Famitsu, Mega Man X5 was the third best-selling video game in Japan during its release week at 46,033 copies sold. It placed at number eight the following week with an additional 22,963 copies sold. Media Create sales information showed that the game was 96th best-selling video game in Japan during 2000. Dengeki Online reported that Mega Man X5 sold a total of 215,687 copies in Japan by the end of 2001, listing it as the 132nd best-selling game of the year in the region. The game was eventually re-released as part of Sony's PlayStation The Best for Family range of budget titles in Japan. Toy Retail Sales Tracking (TRST) sales data showed that Mega Man X5 was the fifth best-selling PlayStation game in North America for the month of February 2001. The game was included on the North American Mega Man X Collection for the Nintendo GameCube and PlayStation 2 in 2006.

References

External links
Official website 
Mega Man X5 at MobyGames
 
  

2000 video games
Malware in fiction
Mega Man X games
PlayStation (console) games
PlayStation Network games
Windows games
Video games about impact events
Video games about terrorism
Terrorism in fiction
Video games about viral outbreaks
Video games developed in Japan
Video games set in the 22nd century
Video games set in Asia
Video games set in Eastern Europe
Video games set in Egypt
Video games set in Norway
Video games set in Russia
Video games set in Somalia
Video games set in South Korea
Superhero video games